Thyroid is a medical journal in the field of endocrinology, covering research on diseases of the thyroid. It is the official journal of the American Thyroid Association and published by Mary Ann Liebert, Inc.

Publications established in 1990
Endocrinology journals
Mary Ann Liebert academic journals
English-language journals
Monthly journals
Academic journals associated with learned and professional societies